Seediq may refer to:

Seediq people
Seediq language, an Atayalic Austronesian language
Seediq Bale

Language and nationality disambiguation pages